Rossia was an armored cruiser of the Imperial Russian Navy built in the 1890s. She was designed as a long-range commerce raider and served as such during the Russo-Japanese War of 1904–05. She was based in Vladivostok when the war broke out and made a number of sorties in search of Japanese shipping in the early months of the war without much success.

Rossia, along with the other armored cruisers of the Vladivostok Cruiser Squadron, attempted to rendezvous in the Strait of Tsushima with the main portion of the Pacific Fleet sailing from Port Arthur in August 1904, but were delayed and had to return to port without them. They encountered a Japanese squadron of four armored cruisers between them and their base shortly after they turned around. The Japanese sank the oldest Russian ship, and damaged Rossia and  during the Battle off Ulsan, but both Russian ships were repaired within two months.

After the end of the war Rossia returned to Kronstadt where she underwent a three-year refit that strengthened her armament. She was fitted with mine rails in 1914 and laid one minefield during World War I that damaged two German light cruisers. She was reconstructed beginning in late 1915 to further strengthen her armament, but played no part during the rest of the war as her crew became involved in revolutionary activities in 1917. She was taken over by the Bolsheviks in late 1917, but was put into reserve in 1918 and sold for scrap in 1922.

Design
Rossia was originally intended to be a repeat of the armored cruiser , but the Director of the Naval Ministry wanted the armor to cover more of the ship's side. However the design went through a number of changes during late 1892 and early 1893 and incorporated a number of technological advances that had recently become available. One notable change was the deletion of Ruriks sailing rig.

General characteristics
She displaced , only  more than designed. Rossia was sheathed in wood and copper to reduce fouling. She was considered to be a good sea boat with a smooth roll—attributable to her tumblehome sides.

Propulsion
In an effort to extend her range, Rossia was built with an unusual machinery arrangement. One large vertical triple expansion (VTE) steam engine drove each of the outer propeller shafts while a small cruising VTE engine drove the center shaft. At full speed the center propeller had to be uncoupled as there was not enough steam to drive all three engines simultaneously; the outer propellers were uncoupled when cruising. The cruising engine developed . Thirty-two Belleville water-tube boilers provided steam for the engines.

In 1898, some of the first large warship trials of oil fuel were carried out.

Armament
Rossias main armament consisted of four  45-caliber Pattern 1892 guns, one at each end of the ship on each side, sponsoned out over the tumblehome of the ship's sides. They were protected by gun shields. The guns could be depressed to −5° and elevated to 18°.

Her secondary armament consisted of sixteen /45 Pattern 1892 guns. One gun was mounted under the forecastle and another in the stern; neither gun could fire to the side. The remaining guns were mounted in hull embrasures. In their pivot mounts the guns could depress to -6° and elevate to +20°. Rossia carried 210 rounds per gun.
 
Defense against torpedo boats was provided by a variety of light-caliber weapons. Twelve  Canet Pattern 1892 50-caliber guns were mounted in sponsons on the upper deck, protected by gun shields. The rate of fire was between twelve and fifteen rounds per minute.

A total of twenty  Hotchkiss guns were carried. Eighteen  Hotchkiss guns were also carried.

Five above-water  torpedo tubes were mounted. These were later replaced by an improved model with two speed/range settings and a  warhead.

Armor
Rossia used newly developed Harvey armor which saved considerable weight over the steel armor used by Rurik for the same amount of protection. Her waterline belt extended from the stern to  short of the bow. It was closed off at the forward end by a  transverse bulkhead. A protective  deck ran forward from the bulkhead to the bow.

Operational history
Rossia was built by the Baltic Works in Saint Petersburg. Construction began in October 1893 although she was not formally laid down until 20 May 1895 and launched on 30 April 1896. After her launch, she was towed to Kronstadt for fitting-out, but on 26 October, she was pushed onto a sandbar by a storm. She was refloated on 15 December. Rossia entered service in late 1896 and participated in Queen Victoria's Diamond Jubilee Fleet Review in June 1897 at Spithead. She returned to Kronstadt to finish her trials before sailing for the Far East in October. She reached Nagasaki, Japan on 10 March 1898 and remained in the Pacific until the beginning of the Russo-Japanese War in 1904.

Russo-Japanese War

At the start of the Russo-Japanese War, Rossia was under the command of Captain Andrei Parfenovich Andreev, and was the flagship of the Vladivostok Cruiser Squadron under the overall command of Rear Admiral Karl Jessen. The squadron made a number of sorties against Japanese shipping early in the war, but only one was reasonably successful when the transport Hitachi Maru, carrying eighteen  siege howitzers and over 1000 troops intended for the siege of Port Arthur, was sunk in June 1904. On an earlier sortie in May 1904 Rossia flew an observation balloon off her quarterdeck to (unsuccessfully) locate Japanese shipping; the first use of an aerial device by a warship on the high seas during a time of war.

Battle off Ulsan

During the war the bulk of the Russian Pacific Fleet was located in Port Arthur where they were blockaded by the Japanese. On 10 August 1904 the ships at Port Arthur attempted breakout to Vladivostok, but were turned back in the Battle of the Yellow Sea. Admiral Jessen was ordered to rendezvous with them, but the order was delayed and his ships had to raise steam, so he did not sortie until the evening of 13 August. Bogatyr had been damaged earlier when she grounded and did not sail with the squadron. By dawn he had reached the island of Tsushima in the Tsushima Strait between Korea and Japan. He turned back for Vladivostok when he failed to see any ships from the Port Arthur squadron.  north of the island he encountered the Japanese squadron commanded by Vice Admiral Kamimura Hikonojō tasked to patrol the Tsushima Strait. The two squadrons had passed during the night without spotting the other and each had reversed course around first light. This put the Japanese ships astride the Russian route to Vladivostok.

Admiral Jessen turned to the northeast when he spotted the Japanese at 5:00 a.m. and they followed suit, albeit on a slightly converging course. The Japanese ships concentrated their fire on Rurik, the rear ship of the Russian formation. She was hit fairly quickly and began to fall astern of the other two ships. Admiral Jessen turned southeast in an attempt to open the range, but this blinded the Russian gunners and prevented any of their broadside guns from bearing on the Japanese. About 06:00 Admiral Jessen turned 180° to starboard in an attempt to reach the Korean coast and to allow Rurik to rejoin the squadron. Admiral Kamimura followed suit around 06:10, but turned to port, which opened the range between the squadrons. Azuma developed engine problems around this time so the Japanese squadron slowed to conform with her best speed. Firing recommenced at 06:24 and Rurik was hit three times in the stern, flooding her steering compartment so that she had to be steered with her engines. Her speed continued to decrease, further exposing her to Japanese fire, and her steering jammed to port around 06:40.

Admiral Jessen made another 180° turn in an attempt to interpose his two ships between the Japanese and Rurik, but the latter ship suddenly turn to starboard and increased speed and passed between Jessen's ships and the Japanese. Admiral Kamimura turned 180° as well so that both squadrons were heading southeast on parallel courses, but Admiral Jessen quickly made another 180° turn so that they headed on opposing courses. Iwate was hit around this time which knocked out three six-inch and one twelve-pounder guns, killing 32 and wounding 43. The Japanese squadron opened the range again when it made a 180° another turn to port. The Russians reversed course for the third time around 07:45 in another attempt to support Rurik although Rossia was on fire herself. Her fires were extinguished about twenty minutes later. Admiral Kamimura circled Rurik to the south at 08:00 and allowed the other two Russian ships to get to his north and gave them an uncontested route to Vladivostok.

Their arrival allowed Kamimura to pursue Jessen with all of his armored cruisers. Azumas engines again broke down during this chase and she was replaced in the line by Tokiwa.

About 10:00 Kamimura's gunnery officer erroneously informed him that Izumo had expended three-quarters of her ammunition and he turned back after a five-minute rapid-fire barrage. He did not wish to leave the Tsushima Strait unguarded and thought that he could expend his remaining ammunition on Rurik. They had radioed Admiral Kamimura that she was sunk, but he did not receive the message. Shortly after the Japanese turned back Gromoboi and Rossia were forced to heave-to to make repairs.

Rossia suffered only 44 dead and 156 wounded; far less than Gromobois 87 dead and 170 wounded. This was attributable to Rossias captain's policy of ordering the gun crews for his quick-firing guns on the engaged side to lay down and those on the unengaged side to go below, in contrast to the other ship keeping her light guns manned at all times. Rossia had been hit nineteen times on the starboard side of her hull and nine on her port side, plus other hits in her funnels, boats and decks. She had half of her guns knocked out and a fire caused by the ignition of excess propellant charges. Despite this number of hits, she was not badly damaged because her waterline belt was not penetrated by any hit. She was repaired within two months by the rudimentary facilities available at Vladivostok. Rossia made no further effort to interfere with Japanese shipping during the war.

Interwar period
Rossia returned to Kronstadt, arriving on 8 April 1906, where she was given a lengthy refit that was finished in 1909. Her engines and boilers were reconditioned, her mainmast was removed and she received additional six-inch guns. Six more guns in lightly armored casemates were added on the upper deck, positioned on each side in the intervals between the main-deck six-inch guns. In addition the bow gun was moved to the upper deck to allow it to fire to each side. This increased the ship's broadside by four guns.

Rossia represented Russia at King George V's Coronation Fleet Review in June 1911. She left for another training cruise to the Azores in September 1913 and was cruising in the Mediterranean in April 1914.

World War I
Rossia served as the flagship of the 2nd Cruiser Brigade of the Baltic Fleet during World War I. She was modified to serve as a fast minelayer with a capacity of one hundred naval mines before the war. She was reconstructed beginning in October 1915 at Kronstadt to increase her armament. Her forecastle deck was removed as well as the fore and aft six-inch guns. They were replaced by two eight-inch guns mounted on the centerline forward and another pair was mounted on the quarterdeck. These additions increased her broadside to six eight-inch, but only seven six-inch guns.

Rossias crew took an active part in the revolutionary movements in 1917 and came under control of the Soviet Red Fleet in September 1917. The Treaty of Brest-Litovsk required the Soviets to evacuate their base at Helsinki in March 1918 or have them interned by newly independent Finland even though the Gulf of Finland was still frozen over. Rossia sailed to Kronstadt in what became known as the 'Ice Voyage' and was placed into reserve shortly after her arrival. She was sold to a German company for scrapping on 1 July 1922. While being towed to Germany in the Baltic Sea, she broke free from her tow and ran aground on the Dyvelseye Shoal on the coast of Estonia on 16 October 1922. She was refloated in August 1923, towed to Kiel, and broken up.

Notes

Footnotes

References

External links

Site in English with photographs
UKonline

World War I cruisers of Russia
Naval ships of Russia
1896 ships
Cruisers of the Imperial Russian Navy
Russo-Japanese War cruisers of Russia
Maritime incidents in 1896
Maritime incidents in 1922
Ships built at the Baltic Shipyard